Nadia Ahmad Samdin (born 1990) is a Singaporean politician and lawyer. A member of the governing People's Action Party (PAP), she has been the Member of Parliament (MP) representing the Cheng San–Seletar division of Ang Mo Kio GRC since 2020.

Education 
Nadia attended CHIJ Katong Convent and Victoria Junior College before graduating from the Singapore Management University with a Bachelor of Laws.

Career 
Nadia was formerly a current affairs producer for CNA. She subsequently returned to TSMP Law Corporation to be associate director in the firm's corporate transactional team. In 2020, she left the firm to join Tri Sector Associates, a social impact consultancy.

Political career
Nadia was fielded in the 2020 general election to contest in Ang Mo Kio GRC when Ang Hin Kee and
Intan Azura Mokhtar stepped down from their respective wards and politics. She is on the People's Action Party's (PAP) ticket against the Reform Party. Her running mates were Lee Hsien Loong, Darryl David, Gan Thiam Poh and Ng Ling Ling. On 11 July 2020, Nadia and the PAP team were declared elected Members of Parliament representing Ang Mo Kio GRC in the 14th Parliament after garnering 71.91% of the valid votes.

Community service 
Nadia used to be a district councillor in the South East Community Development Council and a panel advisor in the Youth Courts. 

She is currently on the board of the People's Association and the Public Transport Council.

References

External links 
 Nadia Ahmad Samdin on Parliament of Singapore

Singaporean women in politics
People's Action Party politicians
Singapore Management University alumni
Victoria Junior College alumni
1990 births
Living people
Members of the Parliament of Singapore